William Atkin Robinson (30 December 1898–1975) was an English footballer who played in the Football League for Bradford (Park Avenue), Hartlepools United and Lincoln City.

References

1898 births
1975 deaths
English footballers
Association football forwards
English Football League players
Hartlepool United F.C. players
Bradford (Park Avenue) A.F.C. players
Lincoln City F.C. players
Gainsborough Trinity F.C. players
Ashington A.F.C. players
Crook Town A.F.C. players